Alvine Emma Njolle Ngonja (born 9 May 1994) is a Cameroonian footballer who plays as a defender for Belarusian club FC Minsk and the Cameroon women's national team.

International career
Njolle played for Cameroon at senior level in the 2020 CAF Women's Olympic Qualifying Tournament (fourth round).

References

External links 
 
 

1994 births
Living people
Women's association football defenders
Cameroonian women's footballers
Cameroon women's international footballers
African Games silver medalists for Cameroon
African Games medalists in football
Competitors at the 2015 African Games
FC Minsk (women) players
Cameroonian expatriate women's footballers
Cameroonian expatriate sportspeople in Belarus
Expatriate women's footballers in Belarus
20th-century Cameroonian women
21st-century Cameroonian women